PT Eka Bogainti, doing business as HokBen (formerly known as Hoka Hoka Bento), is a Japanese fast food chain of restaurants headquartered in Jakarta, Indonesia. The chain of restaurants today span across Java, Bali and Sumatra. The name Hoka Hoka Bento is derived from Japanese which means "steaming bento" (Japanese meal in a package).

History

Established on 18 April 1985 in Kebon Kacang, Jakarta, under PT. Eka Bogainti by Hendra Arifin, HokBen became the largest Japanese fast food chain in Indonesia. Although they serve Japanese fast food, the ownership, management and cooks are entirely Indonesian. There is no Japanese involvement in the business.

In April 2008, the firm had 98 outlets. As of April 2010, there were around 120 outlets, with expansion planned to other Indonesian cities in Central Java, Yogyakarta and Bali. Today, HokBen has 141 restaurant chains in Java and Bali.

Products

HokBen serves various Japanese fast food. However, unlike the common ordering and serving method in most fast food restaurants, HokBen's serving arrangement is set similar to a high school cafeteria where customers move along the line with a tray to collect their dishes. Their menu comprises both set meals and à la carte dishes. Although they define themselves as a Japanese restaurant, most of the food served have been adapted to suit Indonesians' taste. Examples of the change include stronger flavor compared to authentic Japanese food as well as the addition of sambal to cater to Indonesians' preference for spicy food.

HokBen offers a kids' meal package called "Kidzu Bento" which includes toys. They are also able to accommodate for children's birthday parties in their restaurants. The logo and toys offered are based on Hoka Hoka Bento characters.

Mascot
The mascots of HokBen are a pair of adolescent characters named Taro (boy) and Hanako (girl). Both characters appear in the restaurant's logo. It is also used in Japan by New Life Hot Food's.

References

External links 
 Official site

Japanese restaurants
Fast-food chains of Indonesia
Fast-food franchises
Restaurants established in 1985
Indonesian companies established in 1985
Indonesian brands
1985 establishments in Indonesia